The Special Administrative Unit of the Network of National Natural Parks of Colombia (PNN) is Colombian central agency that manages all the national parks and protected areas.

References 

Government agencies established in 1977
 
Ministry of Environment and Sustainable Development (Colombia)

de:Naturparks in Kolumbien
fr:Aires protégées en Colombie
lt:Sąrašas:Kolumbijos nacionaliniai parkai
qu:Kulumbyapi mama llaqta parkikuna sallqa pachap risirwakunapas